Say No More is the debut solo album by English singer Linda Lewis, released in 1971.

Track listing
All tracks composed by Linda Lewis; except where indicated.

Side One
"For Mama"
"Come Along People" 
"The Same Song" - (Ian Samwell)
"Hampstead Way" 
"Peter's Garden" 
"We Can Win" - (Linda Lewis, Ian Samwell)

Side Two
"Funky Kitchen" 
"Follow the Piper" 
"Donkeys Years" - (Linda Lewis, Ian Samwell)
"I Dunno" 
"Magic in the Music" 
"Hymn"

Personnel
Linda Lewis - Vocals, backing vocals, guitar on "Funky Kitchen"
Chris Spedding - Guitars, bass, electric piano
Ray Cooper - Vibraphone, marimba
Shawn Phillips - Guitar
Ian McDonald - Flute
Mike Egan - Guitar
Skaila Kanga - Harp
Fiachra Trench - Keyboards
Louis Cenamo - Bass
George Ford, Terry Cox, Pete Gavin - Drums

References
The Guinness Book of British Hit Albums, fifth edition, 1992
http://www.allmusic.com/album/say-no-more-mw0000846002
original record sleeve notes

1971 debut albums
Linda Lewis albums
Albums produced by Ian Samwell
Reprise Records albums